Vons may refer to:
 Vons, a grocery store
 VONS, a Czech acronym for Committee for the Defense of the Unjustly Prosecuted, a dissident organization

See also
 
 Von (disambiguation)